The Dundonald International Ice Bowl is an ice rink in Dundonald, County Down, Northern Ireland. It was opened in 1986 by Peter Robinson.

Tenants

Current tenants
Ice Rink
Alaska Sports Diner (2004–present)
Xtreme Bowling (1990's-present)
Indiana Land (Children's Mayan themed playzone, 1993–present)
Battlefield Sports N.I. (Laser Combat and Airsoft Games, 2005–Present)
Clip 'n' Climb (2012–present)

Former tenants
Tenpin Bowling (1986-1990s)
Blades Sports Bar (1986-2004)
Choc-O-Bloc (Ice Cream, 2009–201?)

Outside tenants
Urban Assault (1990–present)
Pirate Adventure Golf (2004–present) Sometimes called Crazy Golf

Behind the Ice Bowl is the David Lloyd Fitness Centre and across the road is the Hanwood Business Park and the Dundonald OmniPark (previously Eastpoint Leisure Village from 2009-June 2015), which all make up the Dundonald Leisure Park. There is planning permission for a hotel to be built next to the Ice Bowl and Fitness Centre since the early 2000s.

Pirates Adventure Golf
In 2004, a new golf course opened. It was built where the original main car park was. It has two courses, Blackbeard's Adventure and The Captain's Challenge. In the Winter, a giant cover goes over the Blackbeard's Adventure course so visitors don't get put off and the track stays dry.

Ice hockey
It is the training base and a secondary venue of the Belfast Giants ice hockey team.

During the 2008–09 Elite Ice Hockey League season, the venue hosted the second leg of the Challenge Cup final, which was won 3–1 by the Giants, giving them a 6–5 aggregate victory.

References

Belfast Giants